HLA-B49 (B49) is an HLA-B serotype. B49 is a split antigen from the B21 broad antigen, the sister serotype B50. The serotype identifies the more common HLA-B*50 gene products. (For terminology help see: HLA-serotype tutorial)

Serotype

Allele distribution

References

4